Andrew Nicholas Castle (born 15 November 1963) is a British broadcaster and former tennis player. Castle was UK number 1 in singles tennis in 1986, reaching as high as World No. 80 in June 1988, and No. 45 in doubles in December 1988, with Tim Wilkison of the United States.

Castle reached one Grand Slam final in his career in the 1987 Australian Open mixed doubles event with Anne Hobbs. He won three ATP titles in men's doubles, as well as one title on the Challenger tour.

Between 2000 and 2010, Castle was a presenter on the now defunct ITV breakfast programme GMTV, sharing duties with Ben Shephard to present its weekday magazine programme. In 2009, he began presenting the ITV daytime game show Divided. In 2013, Castle began presenting for LBC.

He has also taken part in Strictly Come Dancing and 71 Degrees North.

Early life
Castle was born in Epsom, Surrey. His mother, Lavinia Pollock (the great-grandchild of Annie Besant), married Frank Castle in April 1953. Andrew was born in 1963. Castle won a tennis scholarship to Millfield School in Somerset but at 15 his parents separated and he had to leave. Another scholarship sent him to Kansas.  He taught tennis at the Wichita Racquet Club to both children and adults.

Castle's father ran the fishmonger's in Westerham, Kent, where his customers included the lady of nearby Chartwell House, Winston Churchill's wife Clementine. He went on to own shops in North Cheam; Norbury; Stoneleigh, Surrey; and owned a fish and chip shop in Taunton, Somerset (Kingston Road).

Tennis career

Castle became a professional tennis player in 1986, after completing a marketing degree whilst on an athletic scholarship in the United States. During his playing career, he was regularly ranked number one in Great Britain. In 1986 Castle reached the third round at Queens Club. He won three tour doubles titles, and was a mixed doubles finalist at the 1987 Australian Open. His 1987 run at the US Open was his best career singles performance at a Grand Slam event, when he reached the third round by defeating David Pate and Jimmy Brown, before losing to Boris Becker in four sets. He represented Britain at the Seoul Olympic Games of 1988, and the Barcelona Olympic Games of 1992. Castle was a regular member of the British Davis Cup team and the European Cup team. His career-high rankings were World No. 80 in singles and No. 45 in doubles.

Castle represents Surrey at squash at over-45s level, and continues to play representative tennis around the world.

Singles: 1  (1 runner-up)

Doubles: 5 (3 titles, 2 runners-up)

Mixed doubles: 1 (1 runner-up)

Media career
After retiring from professional tennis in 1992, Castle served as a commentator and presenter for BSkyB. As well as tennis, he presented basketball, motor racing and golf for Sky.

He joined GMTV in September 2000 as a presenter. After a decade, it was announced in June 2010 he was to leave the programme. Castle presented the final broadcast of GMTV on 3 September 2010.

He is a member of the BAFTA-nominated BBC tennis team, covering Wimbledon, the Aegon Championships at Queen's Club, the French Open, Australian Open and the Davis Cup. Castle has been lead commentator on all men's singles finals since 2003, working alongside John McEnroe, Boris Becker, Jimmy Connors, Tim Henman and John Lloyd.

In 2005, he presented the quiz show Perseverance; he presented two series of the teatime game show Divided (2009–2010); and appeared on Beat the Star on 24 May 2009 – all on ITV. He took part in ITV programme 71 Degrees North in 2010.

Castle previously presented the breakfast show on Smooth Radio and continued on the station with The Great American Songbook on Sunday evenings until 2019. He presents a weekend morning show on speech-based radio station LBC.

Strictly Come Dancing

Castle competed in the sixth series of the celebrity dance competition, Strictly Come Dancing. His partner was Ola Jordan. Castle's appearance marked the third time a main GMTV presenter had participated in the show. After week 4, he was placed 11th out of the remaining 12 contestants, with an average score of 22.5/40. Castle was voted out after round 7 of the competition on 2 November 2008. He scored 21 points for his samba, which placed him second from bottom on the judges' leader board. He appeared in the dance-off with Heather Small, who was saved by all four of the judges.

Personal life
On 18 May 1991, Castle married a former Japan Airlines cabin crew member 
Sophia, whom he had met in Tokyo whilst competing in the Japan Open tennis tournament. They have 2 daughters.

He is the great-great-grandchild of Annie Besant, a prominent British socialist, Theosophist, women's rights activist, writer, orator and supporter of Irish and Indian self-rule, and the uncle of Sienna Nasir-Hawkins, the daughter of Chris Hawkins and Clare Nasir-Hawkins, GMTV weather presenter.

Charities of which he is a patron or supporter include Brainwave, the Dan Maskell Tennis Trust, Great Ormond Street Children's Hospital, Macmillan Cancer Care, the NSPCC and Clic Seargent Cancer Care for Children.

In 2009, Castle became a Patron of the Festival4Stars talent competition. His daughter Georgina Castle was twice runner up in the national finals. She now attends the Central School of Speech and Drama in London.

References

External links
 
 
 
 Andrew Castle on LBC
 
 
 

1963 births
English expatriate sportspeople in the United States

English sports broadcasters
English television presenters
English male tennis players
GMTV presenters and reporters
Living people
People educated at Millfield
Olympic tennis players of Great Britain
Sportspeople from Epsom
Smooth Network presenters
Tennis people from Greater London
Tennis players at the 1988 Summer Olympics
Tennis players at the 1992 Summer Olympics
Motorsport announcers
Golf writers and broadcasters
British male tennis players
LBC radio presenters